Vancleave High School is a "High Performing" public high school located in the unincorporated community of Vancleave, Mississippi, United States. The school serves students in grades 9–12 and is a part of the Jackson County School District in Mississippi. The campus is located on 12424 MS-57 in Vancleave, Mississippi.

Athletics
The Vancleave High School sports team mascot is the Bulldog. Vancleave Athletics consists of Football, Track, Swimming, Cross Country, Softball, Soccer, Volleyball, Basketball, Golf, and Baseball.

Faculty
Vancleave High School's faculty consists of one main Principal and one Assistant Principal. It also consists of Secretaries, Counselors, and Teachers that are listed by departments. Vancleave Schools are also overseen by one Assistant Superintendent, and three bookkeepers.

Administration
 Current Superintendent, John Strycker
 Former Superintendent, Barry Amacker
 Todd Knight, Vice Superintendent

Notable alumni
Chris White, linebacker of the New England Patriots.

References

External links
 Vancleave High School
 Jackson County School District

Public high schools in Mississippi
Schools in Jackson County, Mississippi
1907 establishments in Mississippi